The 65th Cannes Film Festival was held from 16 to 27 May 2012. Italian film director Nanni Moretti was the President of the Jury for the main competition and British actor Tim Roth was the President of the Jury for the Un Certain Regard section. French actress Bérénice Bejo hosted the opening and closing ceremonies.

The festival opened with the US film Moonrise Kingdom, directed by Wes Anderson and closed with the late Claude Miller's final film Thérèse Desqueyroux. The main announcement of the line-up took place on 19 April. The official poster of the festival features Marilyn Monroe, to mark the 50th anniversary of her death.

The Palme d'Or was awarded to Austrian director Michael Haneke for his film Amour. Haneke previously won the Palme d'Or in 2009 for The White Ribbon. The jury gave the Grand Prize to Matteo Garrone's Reality, while Ken Loach's The Angels' Share was awarded the Jury Prize.

Juries

Μain competition
The following people were appointed as the Jury for the feature films of the 2012 Official Selection:
 Nanni Moretti, Italian filmmaker, Jury President
 Hiam Abbass, Palestinian actress and director
 Andrea Arnold, English filmmaker
 Emmanuelle Devos, French actress
 Jean Paul Gaultier, French fashion designer
 Diane Kruger, German actress
 Ewan McGregor, Scottish actor
 Alexander Payne, American filmmaker
 Raoul Peck, Haitian filmmaker

Un Certain Regard
 Tim Roth, British actor, Jury President
 Leïla Bekhti, French actress
 Tonie Marshall, French actress and filmmaker
 Luciano Monteagudo, Argentine film critic
 Sylvie Pras, French responsible for cinemas at the Pompidou Centre and artistic director of the festival of La Rochelle

Caméra d'Or
 Carlos Diegues, Brazilian filmmaker, Jury President
 Gloria Satta, Italian film journalist
 Rémy Chevrin, French cinematographer
 Hervé Icovic, French art director
 Michel Andrieu, French filmmaker
 Francis Gavelle, French film critic

Cinéfoundation and short films
 Jean-Pierre Dardenne, Belgian filmmaker, Jury President
 Arsinée Khanjian, Canadian actress
 Karim Aïnouz, Brazilian filmmaker
 Emmanuel Carrère, French novelist and filmmaker
 Yu Lik-wai, Chinese cinematographer and director

Independent juries
The following independent juries awarded films in the frame of the International Critics' Week.

Nespresso Grand Prize
 Bertrand Bonello, French filmmaker, Jury President
 Francisco Ferreira, Portuguese film critic
 Akiko Kobari, Japanese film and dance critic
 Robert Koehler, American film critic
 Hanns-Georg Rodek, German film critic

France 4 Visionary Award
 Céline Sciamma, French film director
 Victor-Emmanuel Boinem, Belgian film student and blogger
 Kim Seehe, South Korean student and film critic
 Ryan Lattanzio, American student and lead film critic at The Daily Californian
 Bikas Mishra, Indian founder and editor of DearCinema.com

Nikon Discovery Award for Short Film
 João Pedro Rodrigues, Portuguese film director (President)
 Danny Lennon, Canadian film curator
 , Egyptian film director and producer
 Kleber Mendonça Filho, Brazilian film director, curator, and critic
 Jakub Felcman, Czech film curator

Official selection
The official selection was announced on 19 April at Grand Hôtel in Paris. Among comments after the announcement, journalists noted the unusually high number of Hollywood films in the line-up, the absence of any female director in the main competition, as well as the absence of competing first-time feature film directors. The festival's artistic leader Thierry Frémaux responded that people should not focus only on the competition films: "The selection is an ensemble; you have to consider the whole package."

In competition - Feature films
The following films were selected as In Competition. The Palme d'Or winner has been highlighted.

(CdO) indicates film eligible for the Caméra d'Or as directorial debut feature.

Un Certain Regard
The following films were screened in the Un Certain Regard section. The Un Certain Regard Prize winner has been highlighted.

(CdO) indicates film eligible for the Caméra d'Or as directorial debut feature.

Films out of Competition
The following films were screened out of competition:

(CdO) indicates film eligible for the Caméra d'Or as directorial debut feature.

Special screenings
The following films were screened in the Special Screenings section:

(CdO) indicates film eligible for the Caméra d'Or as directorial debut feature.

Cinéfondation
The Cinéfondation section focuses on films made by students at film schools. The following entries were selected, out of more than 1,700 submissions from 320 different schools. The winner of the Cinéfondation First Prize has been highlighted.

Short film competition
Out of 4,500 submissions, the following films were selected for the short film competition. The Short film Palme d'Or winner has been highlighted.

Cannes Classics
The following films were screened in the Cannes Classics section. The Hungarian "montage film" Final Cut: Ladies and Gentlemen, directed by György Pálfi, was selected as the closing film for the Cannes Classics section.

Documentaries about Cinema

Restored prints

 World Cinema Foundation

Cinéma de la Plage
The Cinéma de la Plage is a part of the Official Selection of the festival. The outdoors screenings at the beach cinema of Cannes are open to the public.

Parallel sections

International Critics' Week
The line-up for the International Critics’ Week was announced on 23 April at the section's website. The feature competition consists entirely of directorial debuts, something the section's artistic director Charles Tesson stressed was not intentional, but only the way it turned out when the submissions had been judged by quality. The following films were selected.

Feature films - The winner of the Grand Prix Nespresso has been highlighted. 

(CdO) indicates film eligible for the Caméra d'Or as directorial debut feature.

Short and medium length films

Special Screenings

Directors' Fortnight
The line-up for the Directors' Fortnight was announced at a press conference on 24 April. The following films were selected:

Feature films - The winner of the Art Cinema Award has been highlighted.

(CdO) indicates film eligible for the Caméra d'Or as directorial debut feature.

Short films - The winner of the Premier Prix Illy for Short Filmmaking has been highlighted.

Awards

Official awards
The Palme d'Or was won by the French-language film Amour directed by Michael Haneke. Haneke previously won the award for The White Ribbon in 2009. Love tells the story of an elderly couple preparing for death. During his acceptance speech, the director said "A very, very big thanks to my actors who have made this film. It's their film. They are the essence of this film."

Moretti said that none of the winners had been selected unanimously, and described such an outcome as "a middle ground that would have pleased no one". He revealed that Holy Motors, Paradise: Love and Post Tenebras Lux were the entries that most had divided the jury.

The following films and people received the 2012 Official selection awards:
In Competition
 Palme d'Or: Amour by Michael Haneke
 Grand Prix: Reality by Matteo Garrone
 Best Director: Carlos Reygadas for Post Tenebras Lux
 Best Screenplay: Beyond the Hills by Cristian Mungiu
 Best Actress: Cristina Flutur and Cosmina Stratan for Beyond the Hills
 Best Actor: Mads Mikkelsen for The Hunt
 Jury Prize: The Angels' Share by Ken Loach
Un Certain Regard
 Prix Un Certain Regard: Después de Lucía by Michel Franco
 Un Certain Regard Special Jury Prize: Le grand soir by Benoît Delépine, and Gustave de Kervern
 Un Certain Regard Special Distinction: Children of Sarajevo by Aida Begić
 Un Certain Regard Award for Best Actress:
 Émilie Dequenne in Loving Without Reason
 Suzanne Clément in Laurence Anyways
Golden Camera
 Caméra d'Or: Beasts of the Southern Wild by Benh Zeitlin
Cinéfondation
 1st Prize: The Road to by Taisia Igumentseva
 2nd Prize: Abigail by Matthew James Reilly
 3rd Prize: The Hosts by Miguel Angel Moulet
Short Films
 Short Film Palme d'Or: Silent by L. Rezan Yesilbas

Independent awards
FIPRESCI Prizes
 In the Fog by Sergei Loznitsa (In Competition)
 Beasts of the Southern Wild by Benh Zeitlin (Un Certain Regard)
 Hold Back by Rachid Djaïdani (Directors' Fortnight)

Vulcan Award of the Technical Artist
 Vulcan Award: Charlotte Bruus Christensen (cinematography) for The Hunt (Jagten)

Ecumenical Jury
 Prize of the Ecumenical Jury: The Hunt (Jagten) by Thomas Vinterberg
 Prize of the Ecumenical Jury, Special Mention: Beasts of the Southern Wild by Benh Zeitlin

Awards in the frame of International Critics' Week
 Grand Prix Nespresso: Aquí y allá by Antonio Méndez Esparza
 France 4 Visionary Award: Sofia's Last Ambulance by Ilian Metev
 Prix SACD: God's Neighbors by Meni Yaesh
 ACID/CCAS Prize: The Wild Ones by Alejandro Fadel

Awards in the frame of Directors' Fortnight
 Art Cinema Award: No by Pablo Larraín
 Europa Cinemas: The Repentant by Merzak Allouache
 Prix SACD: Camille Rewinds by Noémie Lvovsky
 Premier Prix Illy for Short Filmmaking: The Curse by Fyzal Boulifa
 Special mention Prix SACD: Ernest & Celestine by Stéphane Aubier, Vincent Patar, Benjamin Renner
 Special mention Prix Illy: The Living Also Cry by Basil da Cunha

Prize of the Youth Jury
 Prix de la Jeunesse: Holy Motors by Leos Carax
 Prix Regard Jeune: Beasts of the Southern Wild by Benh Zeitlin

Association Prix François Chalais
 Prix François Chalais: God's Horses (Les Chevaux De Dieu) by Nabil Ayouch

Queer Palm Jury
 Queer Palm Award: Laurence Anyways by Xavier Dolan
 Short Film Queer Palm: It's Not a Cowboy Movie by Benjamin Parent

Palm Dog Jury
 Palm Dog Award: Smurf in Sightseers
 Grand Jury Prize: Billy Bob in Le grand soir

References

External links

Official website Retrospective 2012 
65ème Festival de Cannes, cinema-francais.fr
Cannes Film Festival: Awards for 2012 at Internet Movie Database

2012
2012 in French cinema
2012 film festivals
2012 festivals in Europe